Sebastián Velásquez (born 11 February 1991) is a Colombian professional footballer who currently plays as a midfielder for Memphis 901.

Early life
Velásquez was born in the Colombian city of Medellín and moved to the United States at a young age, with his family settling in South Carolina.  As a freshman in high school, he was instrumental in winning a state championship with Greenville High School (Greenville, SC), where they also finished the year ranked No. 1 in the nation by NSCAA. At the club level, he played alongside future Real Salt Lake teammate Enzo Martinez and they won a national championship in 2009.  He then played at the junior college level for the Spartanburg Methodist Pioneers in Spartanburg, South Carolina.

Career
Velásquez was selected 36th overall in the 2012 MLS SuperDraft by Real Salt Lake. On March 10, 2012, Velásquez made his professional debut in a start for Real Salt Lake against LA Galaxy. In the 73rd minute, he provided a cross that was turned into the net by Galaxy defender Sean Franklin and Real went on to win the game 3–1. On November 8, 2013, Velásquez scored his first MLS goal with a header during the second leg of the 2013 Western Conference semifinals against LA Galaxy.

In December 2014, he was traded to New York City FC in exchange for allocation money. Velásquez was named NYCFC soccer player of the month by the Third Rail Supporters Club in March 2015.

On January 15, 2016, Velásquez became the first player to be signed by NASL expansion side Rayo OKC.

He's also the first player to make an appearance on the NYCFC Fan Podcast, on April 1, 2016. A milestone for the podcast.

On the January 16th 2019, Velásquez was announced as new player for K League 2 team Suwon FC. This was Velásquez's first football experience outside of the United States. After six months at Suwon, he announced in June 2019, that he had left the club and would return to the United States.

Personal life
Velásquez was raised Catholic by his mother but left the Church in 2013 and joined another Christian denomination. His teammates nicknamed him the Colombian Lionel Messi. After a shooting at a Walmart in El Paso in 2019, he helped raise funds for a girls' youth soccer team that was outside the store at the time of the shooting and took time to meet the players afterwards.

References

External links
 

1991 births
Living people
Former Roman Catholics
Colombian Christians
Footballers from Medellín
Colombian footballers
Real Salt Lake players
New York City FC players
Rayo OKC players
Real Monarchs players
Suwon FC players
El Paso Locomotive FC players
Miami FC players
Bnei Sakhnin F.C. players
Hapoel Umm al-Fahm F.C. players
Memphis 901 FC players
Soccer players from South Carolina
Colombian emigrants to the United States
Real Salt Lake draft picks
Major League Soccer players
North American Soccer League players
USL Championship players
Israeli Premier League players
Spartanburg Methodist Pioneers men's soccer players
Sportspeople from Greenville, South Carolina
Colombian expatriate footballers
Expatriate soccer players in the United States
Expatriate footballers in South Korea
Expatriate footballers in Israel
Colombian expatriate sportspeople in the United States
Colombian expatriate sportspeople in South Korea
Colombian expatriate sportspeople in Israel
Association football midfielders